Dublin County was a parliamentary constituency represented in Dáil Éireann, the lower house of the Irish parliament or Oireachtas from 1921 to 1969. The method of election was proportional representation by means of the single transferable vote (PR-STV).

History and boundaries
The constituency was created in 1921 by the Government of Ireland Act 1920 as a 6-seat constituency for the Southern Ireland House of Commons and a two-seat constituency for the United Kingdom House of Commons at Westminster, combining the former Westminster constituencies of Dublin Pembroke, Dublin Rathmines, North Dublin and South Dublin. At the 1921 election for the Southern Ireland House of Commons, the four seats were won uncontested by Sinn Féin, who treated it as part of the election to the Second Dáil. It was never used as a Westminster constituency; under s. 1(4) of the Irish Free State (Agreement) Act 1922, no writ was to be issued "for a constituency in Ireland other than a constituency in Northern Ireland". Therefore, no vote was held in Dublin County at the 1922 United Kingdom general election on 15 November 1922, shortly before the Irish Free State left the United Kingdom on 6 December 1922.

It was restructured by the Electoral Act 1923, the first electoral act of the new state, becoming an 8-seat constituency, first used at the 1923 general election to the 4th Dáil. It was revised at subsequent revisions, taking into account changes in the boundary and city, before its abolition at the 1969 general election. It was replaced by Dublin County North and Dublin County South.

Throughout its history the constituency consisted primarily of the area of County Dublin, excluding the area of Dublin city. However, at various points it also included some territory from within the boundaries of Dublin City.

TDs

Elections

1965 general election

1961 general election

1957 general election

1954 general election

1951 general election

1948 general election

1947 by-election
A by-election was held to fill the seat left vacant by death of the Fianna Fáil TD Patrick Fogarty. It was won by Seán MacBride of Clann na Poblachta.

1944 general election
Full figures of the last nine counts are unavailable. Ó Droighneáin, Lynch, Bennett and FitzGerald	all lost their deposits.

1943 general election
Full figures for the third to the fourteenth counts are unavailable. Hickey, Costelloe, Ennis, Owens, Bobbett, Roe, O'Farrell and Watkins all lost their deposits.

1938 general election

1937 general election

1935 by-election
A by-election was held to fill the seat left vacant by death of the Fine Gael TD Batt O'Connor. It was won for Fine Gael by Cecil Lavery.

1933 general election

1932 general election

1930 by-election
A by-election was held on 9 December 1930 to fill the seat in the 6th Dáil which had been left vacant by the death of Cumann na nGaedheal TD Bryan Cooper. It was won for Cumann na nGaedheal by Thomas Finlay.

September 1927 general election

1927 by-election
A by-election was held on 14 August 1927 to fill the seat in the 4th Dáil which had been left vacant by the assassination on 10 July of the Minister for Justice, Cumann na nGaedheal TD Kevin O'Higgins. The election was won for Cumann na nGaedheal by Gearóid O'Sullivan, who won nearly 70% of the first-preference votes.

June 1927 general election
Full figures for counts 5 to 18 are not available. Eight candidates lost their deposits (Tench, Morris, Byrne, Brennan, Guinness, McCabe, Rooney and Lynn).

1926 by-election
A by-election was held on 18 February 1926 to fill the seat in the 4th Dáil which had been vacated by the death of the independent TD Darrell Figgis. It was won by the Labour Party candidate William Norton. Norton's win was the first by a Labour Party candidate at any by-election since the establishment of the First Dáil. Labour would next win a seat from another party in a by-election 72 years later, when Seán Ryan won the Dublin North by-election in March 1998.

1924 by-election
A by-election was held on 19 March 1924 to fill the seat in the 4th Dáil which had been left vacant by the death of the Cumann na nGaedheal TD Michael Derham. It was won for Cumann na nGaedheal by Batt O'Connor.

1923 general election

1922 general election

1921 general election
In the 1921 general election to the 2nd Dáil, no constituencies were contested. As in other constituencies, all 6 candidates in Dublin County were returned unopposed.

|}

See also
Dáil constituencies
Politics of the Republic of Ireland
Historic Dáil constituencies
Elections in the Republic of Ireland

References

External links
Dublin Historic Maps: Parliamentary & Dail Constituencies 1780-1969 (a work in progress.)
Oireachtas Members Database

Dáil constituencies in County Dublin (historic)
1921 establishments in Ireland
1969 disestablishments in Ireland
Constituencies established in 1921
Constituencies disestablished in 1969